"Tennessee Rose" is a song written by Karen Brooks and Hank DeVito, and recorded by American country music artist Emmylou Harris.  It was released in January 1982 as the second single from the album Cimarron.  The song reached number 9 on the Billboard Hot Country Singles & Tracks chart.

Chart performance

References

1982 singles
Emmylou Harris songs
Warner Records singles
Songs written by Karen Brooks
Song recordings produced by Brian Ahern (producer)
1981 songs
Songs written by Hank DeVito